Charley Harper (August 4, 1922 – June 10, 2007) was a Cincinnati-based American                   Modernist artist. He was best known for his highly stylized wildlife prints, posters, and book illustrations.  
Born Charles Burton Harper  in Frenchton, West Virginia in 1922, Harper's upbringing on his family farm influenced his work to his last days. He left his farm home to study art at the Art Academy of Cincinnati, and won the academy's first Stephen H. Wilder Traveling Scholarship.  Also during his time at the Academy, and supposedly on the first day, Charley met fellow artist Edie Mckee, whom he married shortly after graduation in 1947.
    
Charley and Edie spent their honeymoon traveling the country, mainly in the west and south, being able to do so because of the Stephen H. Wilder Scholarship the Academy awarded to Charley for post-graduate travels.  Charley Harper returned to the Art Academy of Cincinnati as a teacher and also worked for a commercial firm before working on his own. He and his wife worked out of their Roselawn and Finneytown homes, and later, with their only child Brett Harper, formed Harper Studios.

During his career, Charley Harper illustrated numerous books, notably The Golden Book of Biology, magazines such as   Ford Times, as well as many prints, posters, and other works.  As his subjects are mainly natural, with birds prominently featured, Charley often created works for many nature-based organizations, among them the National Park Service, Cincinnati Zoo, Cincinnati Nature Center, Cornell Lab of Ornithology, Hamilton County (Ohio) Park District, and Hawk Mountain Sanctuary in Pennsylvania. He also designed interpretive displays for Everglades National Park.

Charley Harper died in Cincinnati on Sunday, June 10, 2007, at age 84 after contending with pneumonia for some months.

Style 
In a style he called "minimal realism", Charley Harper captured the essence of his subjects with the fewest possible visual elements.  When asked to describe his unique visual style, Charley responded: 
When I look at a wildlife or nature subject, I don't see the feathers in the wings, I just count the wings. I see exciting shapes, color combinations, patterns, textures, fascinating behavior, and endless possibilities for making interesting pictures. I regard the picture as an ecosystem in which all the elements are interrelated, interdependent, perfectly balanced, without trimming or unutilized parts; and herein lies the lure of painting; in a world of chaos, the picture is one small rectangle in which the artist can create an ordered universe.    
  
He contrasted his nature-oriented artwork with the realism of John James Audubon, drawing influence from Cubism, Minimalism, Einsteinian physics and countless other developments in Modern art and science.  His style distilled and simplified complex organisms and natural subjects, yet they are often arranged in a complex fashion.  On the subject of his simplified forms, Harper noted:
I don't think there was much resistance to the way I simplified things. I think everybody understood that. Some people liked it and others didn't care for it. There's some who want to count all the feathers in the wings and then others who never think about counting the feathers, like me.

The results are bold, colorful, and often whimsical.  The designer Todd Oldham wrote of Harper, "Charley's inspired yet the accurate color sense is undeniable, and when combined with the precision he exacts on rendering only the most important details, one is always left with a sense of awe."
Charley, on numerous examples, also went outside the medium of graphic art and included short prose poems for the artwork he made.

Examples of Harper's style may be seen in the example above, as well as the following United States National Park Service posters:

In 2002 his artwork was selected for the International Migratory Bird Day conservation theme- Exploring Habitats.

Honors 
In honor of Charley Harper's work, December 8, 2006, was declared "Charley Harper Day" by the mayor of Cincinnati:

CHARLEY HARPER DAY: DECEMBER 8 BY MAYORAL PROCLAMATION

Be It Proclaimed:

Whereas, the brilliantly rich, colorful paintings, prints, and illustrations made by artist Charley Harper have delighted Cincinnatians and art lovers around the world since the 1940s; and

Whereas, Charley Harper began his illustrious 60-year career as an artist when he attended The Art Academy of Cincinnati, where he later taught and inspired younger artists; and

Whereas, his bold, stylized images of natural scenes and his whimsical representations of animals have contributed to Charley Harper's vision of "protecting and preserving nature;" and

Whereas, a new generation of contemporary graphic artists have been moved and inspired by Charley Harper's simplified, beautiful imagery and his visionary imagination; and

Whereas, Charley Harper's friendship and mentorship of graphic artist Todd Oldham have inspired the Contemporary Arts Center to exhibit works pairing Cincinnati's mid-century modernist pioneers and contemporary peers in a 15-month exhibition entitled "Graphic Content: Contemporary and Modern/Art and Design;" and

Whereas, Todd Oldham describes Charley Harper's work as "a marvel, brilliant in a way I had never seen before," possessing a "lyrically joyous style," "a remarkable and exquisite color sense" and writes that "Charley's inspired yet the accurate color sense is undeniable, and when combined with the precision he exacts on rendering only the most important details, one is always left with a sense of awe,"

Now, Therefore, I, Mark Mallory, Mayor of the City of Cincinnati do hereby proclaim Friday, December 8, 2006, as CHARLEY HARPER DAY in Cincinnati.

In 2003, the Sharonville Fine Arts Council awarded Harper a Lifetime Achievement Award.

In 2007, an exhibition of the Harpers' early work was held at the Cincinnati Art Museum.

In 2011, the first exhibition of Harper's works in Germany took place at Kunstverein in Hamburg.

In 2020, Harper was posthumously awarded the John A. Ruthven Medal of Distinction.

In 2021, an exhibit of some of Harper's work at the Cincinnati Museum Center.

References

External links

 Excerpts from The Golden Book of Biology (1962)
 Charley Harper Official Online Studio
 Charley Harper store
 A Charley Harper Retrospective (in five parts)

American illustrators
American bird artists
American poster artists
Animal painters
People from Upshur County, West Virginia
Artists from Cincinnati
1922 births
2007 deaths
Art Academy of Cincinnati alumni